The Belladonna coup is the play of a low card away from an accompanying high card, giving the opponents the impossible choice between setting up a winner for declarer and abandoning an attack on another suit.

The provenance of the following spectacular hand, which illustrates the Belladonna coup, is uncertain. A similar layout, with the same key play, is discussed by Victor Mollo. Both sources attribute the coup to Giorgio Belladonna, for many years a cornerstone of the Italian Blue Team. (Belladonna later said that he could not recall having made the key play.) It is said that Belladonna played it as described in a European Community championship in Belgium during the 1980s. But it is also said that Paul Lukacs, the game's pre-eminent composer of single-dummy problems, composed it away from the table.

 Against South's 4, West leads a small trump to East's 10 and South's J. South has several ways to play for ten tricks, which include finding the A onside (50% probability of success), or finding the diamonds 3-3 (36%). The best prospect is to ruff a heart in dummy, but the attack on trumps jeopardizes that plan. If South mis-times the play, the defense can manage to lead three rounds of trumps and win the K, before declarer can ruff the third heart.

Instead of relying on the position of the heart ace or a favorable diamond split, South played for the nearly sure thing by taking a safety play in hearts.

South led to dummy's K and played the 6 away from the K! This gave the E-W an impossible choice:

Notice that South gives up the best chance of making a heart trick (leading toward the K). By giving up the chance for one trick in hearts, South virtually guarantees ten tricks (now only a very unlikely defensive minor suit ruff can defeat the contract).

Notice the presence of the avoidance play theme in this deal.

See also
Morton's fork coup

References

Contract bridge coups